Marcel Šťastný (born 18 February 1983) is a Czech football player who currently plays for Viktoria Žižkov.

References

External links
 
 Guardian Football

1983 births
Living people
Czech footballers
Czech First League players
FK Viktoria Žižkov players
FC Nitra players
Association football defenders